Lebanese mafia is a Colloquial term for organized crime groups which origin from Lebanon and Levant. Lebanese organized crime is active in the country of Lebanon itself, as well as in countries and areas with a large Arab community, most notably United Kingdom, Australia, Germany and Canada also in the Triple Frontier in South America. Lebanese organized crime syndicates generally are active globally, largely due to the mass Arab population. For the past decades the Arab crime families had controlled 78% of Germany's underworld activities.

Beqaa Valley
The Beqaa Valley, a fertile valley in east Lebanon and one of the country's most important farming regions, is also known for being one of the most important cannabis cultivating regions in the Middle East. In certain parts of the region, life is structured around extended clan families, a number of whom are active in criminal activities such as narcotics trafficking, kidnapping for ransom and car theft. Due to the vast international Arab diaspora and along with a certain amount of organized criminals active in their respective communities, the Beqaa Valley has become one of the most infamous marijuana and hashish exporting regions in the world.

International activity

Australia
Arab organized crime was introduced in Australia after the mass immigration of Arab people after the Lebanese Civil War in the 1970s to the end of the 1980s. The first community of Lebanese in Australia were Maronite Christians, quickly followed by a large Muslim community. The main center of Arab organized crime is Sydney, with a significant community of 120,000, followed by Melbourne. Criminal organizations are mostly based around extended crime families with a large number of associates from their community. The main activities of Arab gangs in Australia are narcotics and weapons trafficking, extortion, prostitution, car theft and money laundering. Often different rival criminal families are interlocked in feuds, resulting in a fair amount of violence. Criminal organizations however often transcend religious and cultural barriers, with members of the Sunni communities all involved in the same criminal organizations.

Germany

In analogy with Australia, Arab organized crime also came to Germany following the Lebanese Civil War. A large number of former Lebanese citizens immigrated to several major German cities under political asylum and refugee status. Compared to the Arab population in Australia, a much larger number of Arabs are in Germany and have traditionally settled in large numbers in Lebanese regions such as Tripoli, the Beqaa Valley and Beirut where they have integral part of the country's Sunni community. Under a large number of refugees, there were also several extended clans that already in Lebanon were deeply entrenched in organized crime. In Germany these clans mostly settled in Berlin, Bremen and Essen where they became involved in narcotics trafficking, weapons trafficking, extortion, prostitution, illegal gambling, car theft, money laundering and armed robbery. Some of the more notorious Arab mafia families include the infamous el-koura Younes Clan, the Shams Clan the Al Zein Clan and the Miri Clan from Bremen. These criminal organizations are mostly based around extended criminal clans.

Tri-Border Area
The Triple Frontier, a tri-border area along the junction of Paraguay, Argentina, and Brazil, is often used by Lebanese groups connected to political parties but also by Arab Mafia groups as a heaven for smuggling and money laundering.

See also
 Sword Boys

References

Mafia
Organized crime by ethnic or national origin
Transnational organized crime
Organized crime groups in Argentina
Organised crime groups in Australia
Organised crime in Melbourne
Organised crime in Sydney
Organized crime groups in Brazil
Organised crime groups in Germany
Organized crime groups in Lebanon
Organized crime groups in Sweden
Asian-Australian culture
Arab-Australian culture